Imun is a small dacitic and rhyolitic lava cone at 20 km (12,42 miles) south of Lake Toba and 6 km (3,72 miles) north of the town of Situmeang. Due to its closeness to the much larger caldera of Lake Toba, there is not much information about this small volcano.

See also 

 List of volcanoes in Indonesia

External links

Volcanoes of Sumatra
Mountains of Indonesia
Volcanic cones
Pleistocene volcanoes